Enypniastes is a genus of deep-sea sea cucumber. It is monotypic, being represented by the single species Enypniastes eximia. Due to its unique appearance, the species has been dubbed the headless chicken fish, headless chicken monster, and the Spanish dancer. It is also known as the swimming sea cucumber, and some are called the pink see-through fantasia.

Description 
Species in this genus have developed webbed swimming fin like structures at the front and back of their bodies which enable them to swim up off the surface of the sea floor and to journey as much as  up into the water column. This is thought to help the animals move to new feeding grounds and avoid predators.

Its most distinct feature is its coloring, which is dictated by size: small enypniastes are a bright pink, and larger individuals are a more reddish-brown color. It is also semi-transparent, and its intestine can be seen through its body, especially after feeding. The enypniastes have a round bulbous body, bifurcated tentacles, and a large anterior sail. They can also be bioluminescent.

Distribution and habitat 
The enypniastes can be found mainly in the benthic zone of the ocean. They can be found all over the globe in many different regions. They spend most of their time in the water column, touching down on the seafloor only to eat.

The first sighting in the southern ocean waters occurred in October 2018, when a team from Australia's Department of the Environment and Energy caught an image of E. eximia on a camera that had been deployed in seas near East Antarctica.

Feeding 
The enypniastes feed mostly on benthic sediment. They feed by pushing food into their mouths with their tentacles. They feed very quickly, staying on the seafloor for at most sixty four seconds. Since that is most enough time to feed fully, the enypniastes feed episodically.

Movement 
The enypniastes move using a few methods. The first is that they move their anterior veil in a rowing motion. The second is that when there is a current, the organism will use their tentacles to pull themselves down current. They also move using a pushing motion with their tentacles.

Notes

References
 
http://zipcodezoo.com/Animals/E/Enypniastes_eximia/
The Blue Planet - http://www.bbc.co.uk/nature/blueplanet/factfiles/starfish_urchins/swimming_sea_cucumber_bg.shtml

Holothuroidea genera
Pelagothuriidae
Taxa named by Johan Hjalmar Théel

de:Enypniastes eximia